Manfred Honeck (born 17 September 1958, in Nenzing) is an Austrian conductor.  He is currently the music director of the Pittsburgh Symphony Orchestra.

Early life
Honeck was born in Nenzing, Austria, near the border with Switzerland and Liechtenstein, one of nine children of Otto and Frieda Honeck. One of his brothers is the Vienna Philharmonic concertmaster Rainer Honeck. Beginning as a violinist, Honeck received his musical training at the University of Music and Performing Arts Vienna and later played the viola. He subsequently played in the Vienna Philharmonic and Vienna State Opera Orchestra. His early work as a conductor included a period as assistant to Claudio Abbado with the Gustav Mahler Jugendorchester (Youth Orchestra). In 1987, Honeck founded the Vienna Jeunesse Orchestra.

Career

1991–1999
Following his work with the Mahler Jugendorchester, Honeck conducted regularly at the Zurich Opera House from 1991 to 1996. In 1993, while conducting at the Zurich Opera House, he was awarded the European Conductor's Award. From 1997 to 1998, he was Music Director of the Norwegian National Opera in Oslo, and held a regular position from 1996 to 1999 with the MDR Symphony Orchestra Leipzig. In 1998, he was named the Principal Guest Conductor of the Oslo Philharmonic.

2000–2006
From 2000 to 2006, Honeck was Music Director of the Swedish Radio Symphony Orchestra. Honeck was Principal Guest Conductor of the Czech Philharmonic Orchestra from 2008 to 2011 and then again from 2013 to 2016. He has also been the Artistic Director of the International Concerts Wolfegg in Germany for over 20 years.

2006 to present
Honeck became the General Music Director of the Staatsoper Stuttgart in the 2007–2008 season, with an initial contract for four years. [5] During his tenure in Stuttgart, Honeck conducted productions of Berlioz's Les Troyens, Mozart's Idomeneo, Verdi's Aida, Richard Strauss's Der Rosenkavalier, Poulenc's Dialogues des Carmélites and Wagner's Lohengrin and Parsifal, among other works. Honeck formally concluded his tenure with the Staatsoper Stuttgart in 2011.

Pittsburgh Symphony Orchestra
In May 2006, in the US, Honeck first guest-conducted the Pittsburgh Symphony Orchestra (PSO). In November 2006, he returned to Pittsburgh to conduct the PSO.

On 24 January 2007, the PSO named Honeck its ninth music director, effective with the 2008–2009 season for an initial contract of 3 years. In September 2009, the PSO announced the extension of Honeck's contract to the 2015–2016 season. In February 2012, the PSO announced the further extension of Honeck's contract through the 2019–2020 season. In September 2018, the PSO announced the further extension of Honeck's contract through the 2021–2022 season. In September 2021, the PSO announced the newest extension of Honeck's contract as music director through the 2027-2028 season.

Honeck's work with the Pittsburgh Symphony Orchestra has been documented on recordings with the Exton and Reference labels.  Honeck and the PSO have recorded four SACDs for Reference Recordings, of Strauss tone poems, Dvorak's Eighth Symphony and Janacek's Jenufa Suite, Bruckner's Fourth Symphony, and Beethoven's Fifth and Seventh symphonies. Honeck and the PSO's recordings of Bruckner's Symphony No. 4 and Dvorak's Eighth Symphony and Janacek's Jenufa Suite were nominated for Grammy Awards in Best Orchestral Performance in 2015 and 2014, respectively.

Awards
Honeck was awarded the honorary title of Professor by the Austrian Federal President in 2016. He holds three Honorary Doctorates from Carnegie Mellon University, Catholic University of America, and Saint Vincent College.  In 2018, he was named Artist of the Year by the International Classical Music Awards. On 28 January 2018, Honeck and the PSO were awarded the 2018 Grammy Award for Best Orchestral Performance for their recording of Shostakovich Symphony No. 5 and Barber Adagio for Strings. The recording won a second Grammy for Best Engineered Album (Mark Donahue, engineer).

Personal life
Honeck lives in the village of Altach, Vorarlberg, Austria with his wife Christiane and their six children.

Honeck is a Christian, Roman Catholic, who is known for praying prior to his performances

Selected discography

With Pittsburgh Symphony Orchestra 
 Beethoven: Symphony No. 9, Op. 125 "Choral", Reference (2021)
 Tchaikovsky: Symphony No. 4 – Leshnoff: Double Concerto for Clarinet and Bassoon, Reference (2020)
 Bruckner: Symphony No. 9 in D Minor, Reference (2019)
 Beethoven: Symphony No. 3, Op. 55 "Eroica" – Strauss: Horn Concerto No. 1, Op. 11 (Live), Reference (2018)
 Shostakovich/Barber, Symphony No. 5/Adagio for Strings, Reference (2017)
 Tchaikovsky & Dvorak, Symphony No. 6 and Rusalka Fantasy, Reference (2016)
 Strauss, Elektra & Der Rosenkavalier Suites, Reference (2016)
 Bruckner, Symphony No. 4, Reference (2015)
 Beethoven, Symphonies No. 5 and 7, Reference (2015)
 Dvořák, Symphony No. 8 and Janáček, Jenufa Suite, Reference (2014)
 Richard Strauss, Don Juan, Death and Transfiguration, Till Eulenspiegel, Reference (2013)
 Mahler, Symphony No. 5 in C-Sharp Minor, Exton (2012)
 Tchaikovsky, Symphony No. 5, Exton (2011)
 Mahler, Symphony No. 3, Exton (2011)
 Richard Strauss, Ein Heldenleben, Exton (2010)
 Mahler, Symphony No. 4, Exton (2010)
 Mahler, Symphony No. 1, Exton (2009)

Various Orchestras 
 Beethoven, Suppé, R. Strauss, et al., Frühling in Wien, Wiener Symphoniker (own label), (2017)
 Works by Johann Strauss II and his brothers, Wiener Symphoniker (own label), 2014
 Dvořák, Violin Concerto in A-minor with Anne-Sophie Mutter, Berliner Philharmoniker, Deutsche Grammophon (2013)
 Braunfels: Große Messe, op. 37, Staatsorchester, Staatsopernchor und Collegium Iuvenum Stuttgart, S. Schneider, G. Romberger, M. Klink, Decca (2010)
 Britten, Violin Concerto, Swedish Radio Symphony Orchestra, F.P. Zimmermann – Sony (2009)
 Mozart, Così fan tutte (Salzburg Festival), Wiener Symphoniker, Martinez, Koch, Mathey, Degout, Donath, Aleen –  Decca (2006)
 Allan Pettersson, Symphony no. 12, Swedish Radio Choir, cpo (2006)
 Braunfels: Jeanne d'Arc, Swedish Radio Symphony Orchestra, Eric Ericson Chamber Choir, Banse, Missenhardt, Stenswold, Decca (2001)
 Mahler, Symphony No. 1, BBC Symphony Orchestra, BBCMM-93 (2000)
 Mozart, Requiem, Swedish Radio Symphony and Choir, Querstand (2001)
 Mozart, Wagner, Strauss, et al., Matthias Goerne: German Opera Arias, Swedish Radio Symphony Orchestra, Exton (2000)

References

External links

 IMG Artists agency page on Manfred Honeck
 Pittsburgh Symphony Orchestra page on Manfred Honeck

1958 births
Living people
Male conductors (music)
Austrian classical violists
University of Music and Performing Arts Vienna alumni
Players of the Vienna Philharmonic
21st-century Austrian conductors (music)
21st-century male musicians